Harold Aloysius Murphy (July 6, 1927 – October 11, 1976) was a Canadian  professional ice hockey goaltender who played in one National Hockey League game for the Montreal Canadiens during the 1952–53 NHL season. Loaned from the minor league Montreal Royals of the Quebec Senior Hockey League, Murphy replaced the Canadiens regular goalie Gerry McNeil on November 8, 1952, against the Chicago Black Hawks. He helped the Canadiens win the game, 6–4.

See also
List of players who played only one game in the NHL

References

External links

1927 births
1976 deaths
Canadian ice hockey goaltenders
Ice hockey people from Montreal
Montreal Canadiens players